Evangelos "Vangelis" Sakellariou (alternate spellings: Vagel, Vaggelis) (Greek: Ευάγγελος "Βαγγέλης" Σακελλαρίου; born October 4, 1989 in Athens, Greece) is a Greek professional basketball player who last played for Ionikos Nikaias of the Greek Basket League. He is 1.95m (6'4 ") tall, and he can play at the point guard and shooting guard positions.

Professional career
In his pro career, Sakellariou has played in both the top-tier level Italian League, with Sidigas Avellino, and in the top-tier level Greek League. He was an early entry into the 2009 NBA Draft. He joined the Greek EuroLeague club Panathinaikos, on July 31, 2018.

On February 17, 2019, he won the final of the 2019 Greek Cup, which was held at the Heraklion Indoor Sports Arena, on Crete. Sakellariou also won the 2018–19 Greek League season's championship with Panathinaikos. He averaged 2.5 points and 3.0 rebounds, in 10.0 minutes per game in the Greek League that season.

National team career
Sakellariou was a member of the junior national teams of Greece. With Greece's junior national teams, he played at both the 2008 FIBA Europe Under-20 Championship, and the 2009 FIBA Europe Under-20 Championship, where he won a gold medal.

References

External links
FIBA Profile
FIBA Europe Profile
Eurobasket.com Profile
Draftexpress.com Profile
Basketball-reference.com Profile
Italian League Profile 
Greek Basket League Profile 
Greek Basket League Profile 

1989 births
Living people
Aigaleo B.C. players
Greek men's basketball players
Greek Basket League players
Ionikos Nikaias B.C. players
Lavrio B.C. players
Maroussi B.C. players
Nea Kifissia B.C. players
Pagrati B.C. players
Panathinaikos B.C. players
Panionios B.C. players
Point guards
Rethymno B.C. players
Shooting guards
S.S. Felice Scandone players
Trikala B.C. players
Basketball players from Athens